Roy Douglas Kilburn (born August 10, 1930) was a Canadian ice hockey player with the Penticton Vees. He won a gold medal at the 1955 World Ice Hockey Championships in West Germany.

References

1930 births
Living people
Canadian ice hockey right wingers
Penticton Vees players
Ice hockey people from Edmonton